Ba Thín is a tributary of the Kỳ Cùng River. It originates in the high mountains of Guangxi, China, and joins the Kỳ Cùng River in Qu Xa commune in Lộc Bình District of Lạng Sơn Province in northeastern Vietnam.

References

Rivers of Lạng Sơn province
Rivers of Guangxi
Rivers of Vietnam